Lithium molybdate (Li2MoO4) is a chemical compound.  It is mainly used as an inhibitor in some types of industrial air conditioning.

Uses
Lithium molybdate is used as corrosion inhibitor in LiBr (Lithium bromide) absorption chiller for industrial central air conditioning.  It is manufactured and shipped as either a colorless, transparent fluid or a white crystal powder.  In either state it not classified as a hazardous material.

Li2MoO4 crystals have been found applicable for cryogenic phonon-scintillation detectors, which are used to investigate some rare nuclear processes. The use of Li2MoO4 ceramics for antennas has been studied due to their low loss dielectric properties and the possibility to fabricate them by a room-temperature densification method instead of conventional sintering.
Li2MoO4 (LMO) have also been used with hollow glass microspheres (HGMS) to make low permittivity composite which has been used to make lenses for lens antennas.

References

Molybdates
Lithium compounds
Phosphors and scintillators
Corrosion inhibitors